Campbellton-Dalhousie is a provincial electoral district for the Legislative Assembly of New Brunswick, Canada. It was contested in the 2014 general election, having been created in the 2013 redistribution of electoral boundaries by combining portions of the Campbellton-Restigouche Centre and Dalhousie-Restigouche East electoral districts.  The election was won by Donald Arseneault of the Liberal party.

The district is the geographically smallest in predominantly rural Northern New Brunswick, consisting of the city of Campbellton, the town of Dalhousie and communities along a 20 km stretch of road between them.

The seat was vacated November 30, 2017; Arsenault was given an ultimatum by Liberal Leader Brian Gallant in reference to a perceived conflict of interest. This was not the first time he held the spotlight in controversy; in an infamous deal, over $70 million of taxpayer money (known as the Atcon Scanda) was lost through the decision making of the Liberal Caucus of which he was part (2009). The seat was won by Guy Arseneault on September 24, 2018.

Members of the Legislative Assembly

Election results

References 

Website of the Legislative Assembly of New Brunswick
Map of riding as of 2018

New Brunswick provincial electoral districts
Campbellton, New Brunswick